Mian Sir Muhammad Shah Nawaz    was a prominent politician of Punjab in the 1920s.  He was married to Begum Jahanara Shahnawaz daughter of Mian Muhammad Shafi. He was born in the Arain Mian family of Baghbanpura.

References

Pakistani politicians
Year of death missing
Year of birth missing
Members of the Central Legislative Assembly of India
Mian family